Oaklands Cemetery is a rural cemetery founded in 1854 in West Goshen Township, Chester County, Pennsylvania.

Description and history 
The Oaklands Cemetery was founded in response to the borough council's closure of graveyards within the borders of West Chester and the discontinuation of future burials allowed within it. The ordinance passed on July 21, 1851, and had an effective date of August 20, most likely in reaction to recent cholera epidemics. The Pennsylvania General Assembly passed and Governor William F. Johnston approved an act to incorporate the cemetery on April 14, 1851. The corporators included some of West Chester's most prominent politicians and businessmen, including William Darlington, William Everhart, Joseph J. Lewis, and Washington Townsend. The corporation raised money through contributions by prominent citizens and purchased 23 acres of land from Joseph L. Taylor located one and a half miles north of West Chester to become the cemetery.

The Oaklands Cemetery was dedicated on December 10, 1853. Samuel Rush, a noted lawyer, delivered the principal address, and George W. Pearce wrote the dedication ode. Bodies from the closed borough cemeteries were reburied at Oaklands the following year, along with the start of new burials. Burials grew so slowly that in July 1854 Darlington proposed that the remains of Isaac D. Barnard, a U.S. Senator and War of 1812 hero, be moved to Oaklands to bolster interest in burials there. Barnard's remains were duly exhumed, transported to Oaklands in a grand procession, and interred beneath a newly erected marble obelisk while Darlington gave a speech lauding Barnard's deeds and the "beautiful rural repository of the dead" where he now lay. Interest in the cemetery rose as a result, and by their 1855 annual meeting, the incorporators could boast of fifty-two burials, including thirty-six transfers from other graveyards.

As burials increased, the incorporators laid roads, created a small lake, and built a receiving vault, sexton's cottage, and stone gateway for the new cemetery. By 1888, the cemetery also featured an ornamental fountain as well as a chapel atop a slight rise called Chapel Hill. Towering trees and winding paths made this garden cemetery "one of the most attractive places in the vicinity."

A memorial at the cemetery commemorates the crew of a B-25 bomber that crashed in a forested area of the cemetery on May 7, 1944.

Adjacent cemeteries 
In 1862, additional land was purchased as an annex for the burial of African American decedents. The Chestnut Grove Cemetery Company was incorporated to manage this property on October 27, 1862. It is now the Chestnut Grove Cemetery Annex and as of 1910 consisted of ten acres of land owned and managed by African American residents. DeBaptiste Funeral Home managed the property as of 2013. Painter Horace Pippin, politician Harry W. Bass, and forester Ralph E. Brock are among the interments there.

A portion of Oaklands Cemetery was allotted for Roman Catholic burials. This section became St. Agnes Cemetery, adjoining the Oaklands Cemetery on the north. 

An Orthodox Friends cemetery was established across the street from Oaklands in 1874. Arctic explorer Isaac Israel Hayes and Chester County historian Gilbert Cope are among the interments there.

Notable burials

Samuel Barber (1910–1981), composer best known for his Adagio for Strings and the opera Vanessa
Isaac Dutton Barnard (1791–1834), United States Senator
Thomas S. Bell (1800–1861), Pennsylvania State Senator and justice of the Supreme Court of Pennsylvania
Thomas S. Bell Jr. (1838–1862), Union Army lieutenant colonel killed in action at the Battle of Antietam 
Joseph Emley Borden (1854–1929), Major League Baseball pitcher
Samuel Butler (1825–1891), Pennsylvania State Representative and Pennsylvania Treasurer from 1880 to 1882
Smedley Darlington Butler (1881–1940), United States Marine Corps General, double recipient of the Medal of Honor, and exposer of the Business Plot to overthrow President Franklin D. Roosevelt
Thomas Stalker Butler (1855–1928), United States Representative from 1897 to 1928
William Butler (1822–1909), judge of the United States District Court for the Eastern District of Pennsylvania
Isabel Darlington 1865–1950), lawyer and first woman to practice law in Chester County
Smedley Darlington (1827–1899), United States Representative from 1887 to 1891
William Darlington (1782–1863), botanist and United States Representative from 1815–1817 and 1819–1823
James Bowen Everhart (1785–1868), United States Representative from 1883 to 1887
William Everhart (1785–1868), United States Representative from 1853 to 1855
Thomas Lawrence Eyre (1862–1926), President Pro Tempore of the Pennsylvania Senate from 1921–1922
Henry Ruhl Guss (1825–1907), U.S. Civil War brevet Major General
Alexander Hemphill (1921–1986), Philadelphia City Comptroller and unsuccessful candidate for mayor and US Congress
Joseph Hergesheimer (1880–1954), author best known for novels such as Three Black Pennys and Java Head
John Hickman (1810–1875), United States Representative from 1855 to 1865
Francis James (1799–1886), United States Representative from 1839 to 1843
Dewitt Clinton Lewis (1822–1899), American Civil War Medal of Honor recipient
Joseph J. Lewis (1801–1883), author of the first biography of Abraham Lincoln and Internal Revenue Service commissioner
Henry McIntire (1835–1863), Union Army lieutenant colonel who died of wounds sustained at the Battle of Glendale
Levi Samuel Meyerle (1845–1921), Major League Baseball infielder
George Morris Philips (1851–1920), principal of West Chester University from 1881 to 1920
George W. Roberts (1833–1862), Union Army colonel killed in action at the Battle of Stones River
Joseph Trimble Rothrock (1839–1922), conservationist and Pennsylvania state forestry commissioner
Barclay Rubincam (1920–1978), regionalist painter affiliated with the Brandywine School
George Fairlamb Smith (1840–1877), Union Army colonel, state representative, and Chester County district attorney
David Townsend (1787–1858), botanist, banker, and civic leader in whose honor the genus Townsendia was named
Washington Townsend (1813–1894), United States Representative from 1869 until 1877
William Hollingsworth Whyte (1917–1999), sociologist and journalist who wrote the bestseller The Organization Man
Wilmer Worthington (1804–1873), physician and Speaker of the Pennsylvania State Senate in 1869
Garo Yepremian (1944–2015), professional American football placekicker who played with the Miami Dolphins

References

External links
 Official website
 Oaklands Cemetery at Find a Grave

Cemeteries established in the 1850s
Cemeteries in Chester County, Pennsylvania
West Goshen Township, Chester County, Pennsylvania
1854 establishments in Pennsylvania
Rural cemeteries
West Chester, Pennsylvania